History of Iberia or Georgia, that is All of Sakartvelo or History of Iveria - (Georgian: ისტორია დაწყებითგან ივერიისა, ესე იგი გიორგიისა, რომელ არს სრულიად საქართველოჲსა ან ივერიის ისტორია) - An essay on Georgia, written by Teimuraz Batonishvili on 1832. History covers the period from ancient times to King Mirian.

Creation history
When Teimuraz Batonishvili moved to St. Petersburg, immediately after meeting Marie Brosset, Teimuraz started working on writing "History of Iveria". His tireless work was slowed down by illness. And when he fell ill in January 1836, he did not stop writing despite the doctors' prohibition, and his trip to Prussia stopped his work for several months.

After returning, he continued to work again. Some parts were already finished in 1837.

With this kind of work, the writing of the history of Iveria continued until the last years of his life. Although it was not left unfinished, it remained unpublished. Brosset writes: "For twenty years, he worked on the creation of an extensive history of the Georgian people... It is only known that the author wanted to take advantage of all foreign materials that were not translated into Georgian and Russian."

The mentioned essay "History of Iberia or Georgia, that is All of Sakartvelo" After the request of Teimurazi's wife Elena and Brosset's petition before the Academy, D. was published. by Chubinov. St. Petersburg in 1848.

According to Zakaria Chichinadze, he also wrote the second volume of the history of Georgia, which was lost.

See also

Notes

References

History of Georgia (country)